H. orientalis  may refer to:
 Helleborus orientalis, a flowering plant species
 Heleophryne orientalis, the Eastern ghost frog, a frog species endemic to South Africa
 Huaxiagnathus orientalis, a theropod dinosaur species from the Lower Cretaceous of China
 Hyacinthus orientalis, the common hyacinth, garden hyacinth or Dutch hyacinth, a perennial flowering plant species native to southwestern Asia, in southern and central Turkey, northwestern Syria, Lebanon and northern Israel
 An orthographic variant of Halorubrum orientale, a halophilic archaeon.

See also
 Orientalis (disambiguation)